Nicole Bunyan (born 22 November 1993 in Victoria, BC) is a Canadian professional squash player. As of January 2022, she was ranked number 47 in the world.

In June 2022, Bunyan was named to Canada's 2022 Commonwealth Games team.

References

1993 births
Living people
Canadian female squash players
Squash players at the 2022 Commonwealth Games
21st-century Canadian women